Fatmir Xhafaj (born 17 May 1959, in Vlorë) is an Albanian politician, chair of the Ad Hoc Parliamentary Committee on the Judicial System Reform of the Parliament of Albania. He served as the Albanian Minister of Interior Affairs from 2017 to 2018.

Education 
Xhafaj graduated in Legal and Political Sciences (Justice) at the University of Tirana in 1982. He then worked as a lawyer (Judicial Adviser, Judge, Prosecutor), as well as high level functionary for various youth and social organizations in 1982-1986. 

He then served as legal advisor for a consultancy company in 1994-1997, and was a freelance professional lawyer and law firm founding partner in 1999-2001.

Political career 
Xhafaj is member of the Socialist Party of Albania since 1991, and has been Secretary for Legal Matters of the party in 2005-2011 and Coordination Secretary since 2011. He is also member of the Headship of the party since 2007.

Xhafaj has been an elected MP for the Socialist Party of Albania, representing the Tirana County, from the V to the VIII legislatures (since 2001). He has co-chaired the Ad Hoc Committee for the Electoral Reform in 2003, 2007 and 2009, and was deputy chairman of the Parliamentary Committee for Legal Issues, Public Administration and Human Rights in 2009-2013. Since September 2013 he chairs the Parliamentary Committee for Legal Issues, Public Administration and Human Rights, and since November 2014 also the Ad Hoc Parliamentary Committee on the Judicial System Reform.

As a member of the Government of Albania, Mr. Xhafaj was General Secretary of the Council of Ministers from 1997 to 1999, as well as Minister for Territorial Regulation and Tourism in 2002, and Minister of Justice from 2003 to 2005.

References 

1959 births
Living people
People from Vlorë
University of Tirana alumni
Members of the Parliament of Albania
Government ministers of Albania
Interior ministers of Albania
Justice ministers of Albania
Tourism ministers of Albania
Socialist Party of Albania politicians
21st-century Albanian politicians